A sandwich-structured composite is a special class of composite materials that is fabricated by attaching two thin but stiff skins to a lightweight but thick core. The core material is normally low strength material, but its higher thickness provides the sandwich composite with high bending stiffness with overall low density.

Open- and closed-cell-structured foams like polyethersulfone polyvinylchloride, polyurethane, polyethylene or polystyrene foams, balsa wood, syntactic foams, and honeycombs are commonly used core materials. Sometimes, the honeycomb structure is filled with other foams for added strength. Open- and closed-cell metal foam can also be used as core materials.

Laminates of glass or carbon fiber-reinforced thermoplastics or mainly thermoset polymers (unsaturated polyesters, epoxies...) are widely used as skin materials. Sheet metal is also used as skin material in some cases.

The core is bonded to the skins with an adhesive or with metal components by brazing together.

History 
A summary of the important developments in sandwich structures is given below.

 230 BC              Archimedes describes the laws of levers and a way to calculate density.
 25 BC               Vitruvius reports about the efficient use of materials in Roman truss roof structures.
 1493                Leonardo da Vinci discovers the neutral axis and load deflection relation in three-point bending. 
 1570                Palladio presents truss-beam constructions with diagonal beams to prevent shear deformations.    
 1638                Galileo Galilei describes the efficiency of tubes versus solid rods.
 1652                Wendelin Schildknecht reports about sandwich beam structures with curved wooden beam reinforcements.
 1726                Jacob Leupold documents tubular bridges with compression loaded roofs.
 1786                Victor Louis uses iron sandwich beams in the galleries of the Palais-Royal in Paris.
 1802                Jean-Baptiste Rondelet analyses and documents the sandwich effect in a beam with spacers.
 1820                Alphonse Duleau discovers and publishes the moment of inertia for sandwich constructions.
 1830                Robert Stephenson builds the Planet locomotive using a sandwich beam frame made of  wood plated with iron  
 1914                R. Höfler and S. Renyi patent the first use of honeycomb structures for structural applications.
 1915                Hugo Junkers patents the first honeycomb cores for aircraft application.
 1934                Edward G. Budd patents welded steel honeycomb sandwich panel from corrugated metal sheets.
 1937                Claude Dornier patents a honeycomb sandwich panel with skins pressed in a plastic state into the core cell walls.
 1938                Norman de Bruyne patents the structural adhesive bonding of honeycomb sandwich structures.
 1940                The de Havilland Mosquito was built with sandwich composites; a balsawood core with plywood skins.

Types of sandwich structures 
Metal composite material (MCM) is a type of sandwich formed from two thin skins of metal bonded to a plastic core in a continuous process under controlled pressure, heat, and tension.

Recycled paper is also now being used over a closed-cell recycled kraft honeycomb core, creating a lightweight, strong, and fully repulpable composite board. This material is being used for applications including point-of-purchase displays, bulkheads, recyclable office furniture, exhibition stands, wall dividers and terrace boards.

To fix different panels, among other solutions, a transition zone is normally used, which is a gradual reduction of the core height, until the two fiber skins are in touch. In this place, the fixation can be made by means of bolts, rivets, or adhesive.

With respect to the core type and the way the core supports the skins, sandwich structures can be divided into the following groups: homogeneously supported, locally supported, regionally supported, unidirectionally supported, bidirectionally supported. The latter group is represented by honeycomb structure which, due to an optimal performance-to-weight ratio, is typically used in most demanding applications including aerospace.

Properties of  sandwich structures 
The strength of the composite material is dependent largely on two factors:
The outer skins:  If the sandwich is supported on both sides, and then stressed by means of a downward force in the middle of the beam, then the bending moment will introduce shear forces in the material.  The shear forces result in the bottom skin in tension and the top skin in compression.  The core material spaces these two skins apart.  The thicker the core material the stronger the composite.  This principle works in much the same way as an I-beam does.
The interface between the core and the skin:  Because the shear stresses in the composite material change rapidly between the core and the skin, the adhesive layer also sees some degree of shear force.  If the adhesive bond between the two layers is too weak, the most probable result will be delamination. The failure of the interface between the skin and core is critical and the most common damage mode. The propensity of this damage to propagate through the interface or dive either into the skin or core is governed by the shear component.

Application of sandwich structures 

Sandwich structures can be widely used in sandwich panels, with different types such as FRP sandwich panel, aluminium composite panel, etc. FRP polyester reinforced composite honeycomb panel (sandwich panel) is made of polyester reinforced plastic, multi-axial high-strength glass fiber and PP honeycomb panel in special antiskid tread pattern mold through the process of constant temperature vacuum adsorption & agglutination and solidification.

Theory

Sandwich theory describes the behaviour of a beam, plate, or shell which consists of three layers - two face sheets and one core.  The most commonly used sandwich theory is linear and is an extension of first order beam theory.  Linear local buckling sandwich theory is of importance for the design and analysis of Sandwich plates or sandwich panels, which are of use in building construction, vehicle construction, airplane construction and refrigeration engineering.

See also

Sandwich panel
Sandwich plate system
Composite honeycomb
Honeycomb Structures
Sandwich theory
 Flitch beam
 Bending
 Beam theory
 Composite material
 Hill yield criteria
 Timoshenko beam theory
 Plate theory
 Sandwich Panel

References

External links
SandwichPanels.org – Composite sandwich structure information
Diab Sandwich Handbook
Honeycomb Sandwich Design Technology
Engineered timber sandwich core materials – Composite sandwich structure information
-Application of aluminium honeycomb sandwich panel as an energy absorber of high-speed train nose

Composite materials
Aerospace materials